Winn Parish School Board is a school district headquartered in Winnfield, Louisiana, United States.

The district serves Winn Parish.

School uniforms
The district requires all students to wear school uniforms.

Schools

PK-12 schools
 Atlanta High School  (Atlanta)
 Calvin High School  (Calvin)
 Dodson High School  (Dodson)

Secondary schools
 9-12: Winnfield Senior High School  (Unincorporated area)
 6-8: Winnfield Middle School (Unincorporated area)

Primary schools
 4-5: Winnfield Intermediate School (Winnfield)
 1-3: Winnfield Primary School (Winnfield)
 PK-K: Winnfield Kindergarten School (Winnfield)

References

External links

 Winn Parish School Board

Education in Winn Parish, Louisiana
School districts in Louisiana